Rohleder is a German surname, which means raw leather. Notable people with the surname include:

George Rohleder (1898–1958), American football player
Gilbert V. Rohleder (1922–2016), American businessman
James Rohleder (born 1955), German judoka
Kevin Rohleder (1920–1983), Australian rules footballer
Martin Rohleder, British slalom canoeist
Noel Rohleder (born 1933), Australian rules footballer

See also
Roleder

German-language surnames